The 2000 United States elections were held on November 7, 2000. Republican Governor George W. Bush of Texas defeated Democratic Vice President Al Gore of Tennessee in the presidential election. Republicans retained control of both houses of Congress, giving the party unified control of Congress and the presidency for the first time since the 1954 elections.

With Democratic President Bill Clinton term-limited, Gore won his party's nomination by defeating Senator Bill Bradley in the Democratic primaries. Bush defeated Senator John McCain in the Republican primaries to win his party's presidential nomination. Bush took 271 of the 538 electoral votes, winning the decisive state of Florida by a margin of 537 votes after a recount was halted by the Supreme Court in the case of Bush v. Gore. Bush was the first winning presidential candidate to lose the popular vote since the 1888 presidential election. This marked the first time since 1988 that the president's party lost seats in both Houses.

Democrats picked up a net of four seats in the Senate, tying Republicans, however Dick Cheney provided the tie-breaking vote as Vice President of the United States. Republicans maintained control of the chamber until June 6, 2001, when Senator Jim Jeffords left the Republican Party and began caucusing with the Democrats. Democrats also picked up a net of one seat in the House, but Republicans retained an overall narrow majority. In the gubernatorial elections, Democrats won a net gain of one seat.

Federal elections

President

In the 2000 presidential election, Republican Texas Governor George W. Bush defeated Democratic incumbent Vice President Al Gore. The election was eye-catchingly close, but was the third straight election where neither party won a majority of the popular vote.

United States Senate

The 33 seats in the United States Senate Class 1 were up for election plus one special election. Democrats picked up net of four seats. Six senators were defeated in the November 2000 election.  The five defeated Republicans included Spencer Abraham of Michigan, John Ashcroft of Missouri, Slade Gorton of Washington, Rod Grams of Minnesota, and William V. Roth of Delaware.  The single defeated Democrat was Charles S. Robb of Virginia.

The Senate elections left both parties with control of fifty Senate seats. In the subsequent 107th United States Congress, Democrats controlled the Senate from January 3, 2001, to January 20, 2001, when Dick Cheney was sworn in as vice president. Republicans maintained control of the chamber until June 6, 2001, when Senator Jim Jeffords left the Republican Party and began caucusing with the Democrats.

United States House of Representatives

Republicans won the national popular vote for the House of Representatives by a margin of 0.5 points. Republicans lost two seats in the House, while Democrats gained 1 seat and 1 independent, Virgil Goode, was elected. Following the 2000 election, the majority of the House seaters in the South and Midwest were held by the Republican party, while the larger number of seats in the Northeast and West were held by the Democratic party.

State elections

Gubernatorial elections

One sitting governor was defeated in the November 2000 general election.  Cecil H. Underwood, Republican of West Virginia, concluded the 2000 election with a 47.2 election percentage. Democrat Bob Wise was elected to a four-year term.

State legislative elections

Democrats won control of the Colorado Senate for the first time since 1963. Republicans won control of the Missouri Senate for the first time since 1949, the New Hampshire Senate which was previously tied, the South Carolina Senate for the first time since 1879, and the Vermont House of Representatives. 

Additionally, a coalition government replaced the Republican-controlled Arizona Senate and the Democratic-controlled Maine Senate.

Local elections

Mayoral elections
Some of the major American cities that held their mayoral elections in 2000 included:

San Diego – Superior Court Judge Dick Murphy (R) was elected to a first term as mayor.

Initiatives and referendums

 State constitutional amendments prohibiting same-sex marriage and civil unions is passed in Nebraska and Nevada passes constitutional ban on same-sex marriage only, but it doesn't go into effect because the Nevada Constitution requires two ballot votes for citizen-initiated constitutional amendments.

References

External links
 United States Election 2000 Web Archive from the U.S. Library of Congress

2000 elections in the United States
2000